Mike Hintz is a former defensive back in the National Football League. He played with the Chicago Bears during the 1987 NFL season.

References

Sportspeople from Eau Claire, Wisconsin
Players of American football from Wisconsin
Chicago Bears players
American football defensive backs
Wisconsin–Platteville Pioneers football players
1965 births
Living people
National Football League replacement players